Australia's Naughtiest Home Videos is an Australian television comedy programme that was broadcast on Nine Network on 3 September 1992. It was a one-off special spin-off of Australia's Funniest Home Video Show, depicting videos of sexual situations and other sexually explicit content. The program was notably taken off the air partway through the broadcast of its first and only episode on the order of then-network owner Kerry Packer.

Background 
Australia's Funniest Home Video Show premiered in 1990, and was similar in concept to the 1989 American special (and later series) America's Funniest Home Videos: viewers would send in amateur-shot videos that were unintentionally humorous, and the video deemed the "funniest" by the studio audience was awarded a prize at the end of the show.

The producers often received racy or risque videos that could not be included into the programme due to its family-friendly nature, and since the show's policy stated that videos sent in by viewers could not be sent back, videos that did not make it onto the program were still kept by the station. The producers decided to compile these videos into a one-off special aimed at an adult audience.

It differed from Australia's Funniest Home Video Show in more than just the content of the videos. It had a different opening, a modified version of the Australia's Funniest Home Video Show theme song, and a slightly modified set. It was hosted by Australian radio personality Doug Mulray. Due to the difference in content, the show aired at 8:30 PM and was preceded by a short message warning viewers of the show's content, and informing them that it was a one-off special that was different from Australia's Funniest Home Video Show.

Content 
The show followed the same structure of Australia's Funniest Home Video Show, in which the videos were shown in short blocks, interspersed with humorous monologues written and delivered by Mulray. Mulray often poked fun at the content of the videos, which he described as "The most sensational collection of home videos since Rodney King nicked out for a pizza recently." Mulray also did humorous voice overs as the videos were shown, similar to Danny McMaster's on Australia's Funniest Home Video Show.

The content of the videos included shots of animal genitalia, humans or animals humorously engaging in sexual intercourse, people who get accidentally and humorously disrobed, and other situations that often relied on ribald humour, including a child grabbing a kangaroo's testicles, a man lifting a barbell with his penis, a man getting his head squeezed between an erotic dancer's large breasts, an elderly woman removing an envelope from a stripper's undergarments with her dentures, two people running into water with flaming pieces of toilet paper hanging from their buttocks, and two people filmed having sex in the middle of a park.

Cancellation 

Kerry Packer, the owner of the Nine Network at the time, was informed of the show's content by friends while having dinner. He tuned in to watch the show, which was being transmitted on TCN-9, and was so offended by its content that he phoned the studio operators and angrily shouted, "Get that shit off the air!". Within minutes, the programme was pulled. Viewers saw a Nine Network bumper interrupt the programme with an announcement about there being "a technical problem" before beginning a rerun of the American sitcom Cheers, which filled the remaining airtime. 

Although the same Nine Network bumper and announcement interrupted the show during every broadcast across Australia, it occurred in different parts of the programme depending on the area it was airing in, due to time differences: In the eastern states, the station simply started airing an episode of Cheers after a scheduled commercial break, but in other areas, the last part of the show broadcast was of Mulray giving a monologue about "bosoms" or the aforementioned clip of a child grabbing a kangaroo's scrotum. The show was cancelled before it was scheduled to air in Perth, and thus its Nine Network affiliate displayed a graphic of the Nine Network logo on-screen while a brief message mentioning that the special is cancelled before beginning an episode of Cheers. The message went as follows: 

"We apologise for this interruption. Unfortunately, a technical problem prevents us continuing our scheduled programme for the moment. In the meantime, we bring you a brief, alternative programme."

Despite Packer's objections to the series' content, it was popular among viewers. The special was recorded to a record studio audience. After the announcement, Nine reportedly received "thousands" of phone calls from viewers, with 65 percent of callers upset with the programme being pulled, in contrast to the 60 callers who called in during the show's broadcast, complaining about the show. Viewers were generally bewildered by the sudden interruption and the cut to Cheers, not knowing about the show's cancellation until it was widely reported by the Australian media outlets the next day.

The day after the special aired, a furious Packer showed up at Nine's headquarters and held meetings in which he loudly berated Nine's managers and censors, referring to the program as "disgusting and offensive shit." After these meetings, Mulray and many of the staff who were involved with the creation of the special were fired, with Mulray also being banned for life from Channel Nine. Kris Noble, the network's drama and entertainment chief, hid the original tape in the archives of the network's Willoughby studio.

On his radio show the next day, Mulray commented, "I am the first man in Australian history to be pulled off by Kerry Packer."

Mulray returned to Nine to be a judge on the 2005 series StarStruck shortly after Packer's death on 26 December of that year.

Rebroadcast 
In 2008, the original tape of the show hidden by Noble was located by Nine's head of factual television.

It was aired in its entirety at 8:30 PM on 28 August 2008, one week short of sixteen years after the original special, and at the same time. Promoted as "the show Kerry Packer didn't want you to see", it featured commentary from Bert Newton; Packer had died in December 2005, and Mulray refused Nine's request to host the special.

The special was interrupted by the Channel Nine bumper and "technical difficulties" announcement 36 minutes in, cutting to the Cheers opening credits before resuming to a monologue by Newton, who referenced the incident by saying "Instead, they got that announcement of 'technical difficulties' which you heard, which was true...it's TECHNICALLY very DIFFICULT to keep a show on air...with Mr. Packer on the phone YELLING at you!" The latter part of the special that never aired was then broadcast. However the re-airing was censored, with portions of Mulray's monologues (including jibes about "fat kids") being cut from the special as they were deemed to be "no longer acceptable".

See also 
 Turn-On, an American sketch comedy TV series that was also pulled from broadcast during its first and only episode.
 Videos After Dark, an American adaptation of Australia's Naughtiest Home Videos that debuted in 2019 and likewise was canceled after only one airing.

References 

Nine Network original programming
1992 Australian television series debuts
1992 Australian television series endings
Australian comedy television series
Television shows set in Sydney
Television controversies in Australia
Video clip television series
English-language television shows
Parody television series
Obscenity controversies in television
Television series canceled after one episode